Zaboršt pri Dolu is a settlement in the Municipality of Dol pri Ljubljani in the Upper Carniola region of Slovenia.

Name
The name of the settlement was changed from Zaboršt to Zaboršt pri Dolu in 1953.

Church
The local church is dedicated to Saint Catherine. A fragment of a fresco of Saint Christopher is preserved on its southern exterior wall, dating to the early 15th century. The church was rebuilt in the 17th and 18th centuries. The belfry dates to 1689.

References

External links

Zaboršt pri Dolu on Geopedia

Populated places in the Municipality of Dol pri Ljubljani